András "André" Simonyi (31 March 1914 – 17 July 2002) was a Hungarian-born French footballer who played for Lille OSC, FC Sochaux, Red Star 93, Rennes, Angers SCO, Stade Français and CO Roubaix-Tourcoing, as well as with the French national side.

After retiring as a player, Simonyi enjoyed a management career with Angers SCO, Red Star 93 and AS Cherbourg.

References

Printed sources

Web sources

External links
 
 

1914 births
2002 deaths
People from Khust
Hungarian emigrants to France 
Naturalized citizens of France 
Association football forwards
French footballers
France international footballers
FC Sochaux-Montbéliard players
Red Star F.C. players
Stade Rennais F.C. players
Angers SCO players
Stade Français (association football) players
FC Rouen players
AS Cherbourg Football players
Ligue 1 players
Ligue 2 players
French football managers
AS Cherbourg Football managers
Angers SCO managers
Red Star F.C. managers
S.C. Covilhã players
CO Roubaix-Tourcoing players
French people of Hungarian descent